Mauricio Enrique Candiani Galaz (born 24 November 1972) is a Mexican politician and businessman from the National Action Party. From 2000 to 2003 he served as Deputy of the LVIII Legislature of the Mexican Congress representing the Federal District.

References

1972 births
Living people
Politicians from Mexico City
Mexican businesspeople
Members of the Chamber of Deputies (Mexico)
National Action Party (Mexico) politicians
21st-century Mexican politicians